Nardin Mulahusejnović (born 9 February 1998) is a Bosnian professional footballer who plays as a forward for Russian club Dynamo Makhachkala.

Club career

Early career
Mulahusejnović came through Bratstvo Gračanica's youth academy, and also spent some time in Željezničar's youth setup. He made his debut against Jedinstvo Bihać on 5 March 2016 at the age of 18. Over a year later, on 11 March 2017, he scored his first senior goal.

In June 2017 Mulahusejnović signed a multi-year contract with Zrinjski Mostar. In January 2018, he was sent on a six-month loan to GOŠK Gabela.

Maribor
On 29 June 2018, Mulahusejnović signed a four-year contract with Slovenian club Maribor. He won his first trophy with the club on 15 May 2019, when they were crowned league champions. A week later, he made his competitive debut for Maribor against Krško.

Mulahusejnović scored his first goal for the team against Triglav on 13 July 2019.

International career
Mulahusejnović was a member of the Bosnia and Herzegovina under-21 team under coach Vinko Marinović.

Career statistics

Club

Honours
Maribor
Slovenian PrvaLiga: 2018–19

Individual
Slovenian PrvaLiga top scorer: 2020–21

Notes

References

External links
Nardin Mulahusejnović at NZS 

1998 births
Living people
People from Gračanica, Bosnia and Herzegovina
Bosniaks of Bosnia and Herzegovina
Bosnia and Herzegovina Muslims
Bosnia and Herzegovina footballers
Bosnia and Herzegovina under-21 international footballers
Association football forwards
NK Bratstvo Gračanica players
HŠK Zrinjski Mostar players
NK GOŠK Gabela players
NK Maribor players
FC Koper players
NŠ Mura players
FK Sarajevo players
FC Dynamo Makhachkala players
First League of the Federation of Bosnia and Herzegovina players
Premier League of Bosnia and Herzegovina players
Slovenian PrvaLiga players

Bosnia and Herzegovina expatriate footballers
Expatriate footballers in Slovenia
Bosnia and Herzegovina expatriate sportspeople in Slovenia
Expatriate footballers in Russia
Bosnia and Herzegovina expatriate sportspeople in Russia